Fledgling or Fledglings may refer to:

Animals
 Fledgling (bird), a young bird that has recently left its nest but remains parentally dependent

Literature
 Fledgling (Butler novel), a 2005 vampire novel by Octavia E. Butler
 Fledgling, a 2009 Liaden universe novel by Sharon Lee and Steve Miller

Other uses
 Curtiss Fledgling, an American model of military trainer aircraft
 Fergie's Fledglings, a group of Manchester United football players

See also

 Fledg'ling Records